Carrie Borzillo (formerly Carrie Borzillo-Vrenna; born June 20, 1970) is an American music and entertainment journalist and author of three books on aspects of the entertainment industry and of one advice book.

Journalist 
Borzillo has dispensed love and sex advice as "Dr. Love" throughout the run of rock musician Gene Simmons’ short-lived glossy monthly, Tongue, and has written the sex/love advice column "Miss Truth Hurts" for SuicideGirls.com.

Bibliography 
Cherry Bomb, 
Eyewitness Nirvana: The Day-by-Day Chronicle, author
Nirvana: The Day-to-Day Illustrated Journals, author
Kurt Cobain: The Nirvana Years, 
Nobody Likes You: Inside the Turbulent Life, Times and Music of Green Day, contributor (authored by Marc Spitz)
Tera Patrick: Sinner Takes All: A Memoir of Love and Porn, ASIN: B003RISWIY
Bowie: A Biography, contributor (authored by Marc Spitz)

Awards 
1998: Named one of the 100 Most Influential Californians in the Music Industry by Bam magazine
2009: Best Music Journalist, National Association of Record Industry Professionals' Best in the Biz Awards.

References

External links 

1970 births
Living people
People from Wallingford, Connecticut
American relationships and sexuality writers
American writers of Italian descent
Writers from Los Angeles
Writers from Connecticut
Southern Connecticut State University alumni
American music journalists
American women non-fiction writers
21st-century American women